Jeopardy! Masters is an upcoming American game show hosted by Ken Jennings that is scheduled to premiere on primetime on ABC. The series will feature six recent notable Jeopardy! champions competing against each other in a "Champions League-style" format. As of February 3, 2023, no premiere date has yet been announced.

Gameplay
The tournament features six former Jeopardy! champions competing round-robin style, with ten hour-long episodes featuring two games each. Each of the 20 possible combinations of six players will be played, with all six players appearing in one game each episode.

Contestants
Six contestants have been announced as competitors in the series, listed below in order of all-time Jeopardy! winnings:
 James Holzhauer
 Amy Schneider
 Matt Amodio
 Mattea Roach
 Andrew He
 Sam Buttrey

References

External links
 

2020s American game shows
2023 American television series debuts
Upcoming television series
American Broadcasting Company original programming
American television spin-offs
Culver City, California
English-language television shows
Jeopardy!
Television series by Sony Pictures Television
Television series created by Merv Griffin